Datići  is a village in the municipality of Kiseljak, Bosnia and Herzegovina.

Demographics 
According to the 2013 census, its population was 45.

References

Populated places in Kiseljak